The 4th Aviation Regiment is an aviation regiment of the United States Army, tracing its history back to 1957.

Lineage
The regiment was constituted 1 April 1957 in the Regular Army as the 4th Aviation Company, assigned to the 4th Infantry Division, and activated at Fort Lewis, Washington.

Reorganized and redesignated 1 October 1963 as Headquarters and Headquarters Company, 4th Aviation Battalion (organic elements constituted 21 August 1963 and activated 1 October 1963).

In Vietnam the battalion fought in the official campaigns designated Vietnam; Counteroffensive, Phase II (Operation Sam Houston); Counteroffensive, Phase III (Operation Francis Marion); Tet Counteroffensive (Operation MacArthur); Counteroffensive, Phase IV; Counteroffensive, Phase V; Counteroffensive, Phase VI; Tet 69/Counteroffensive; Summer–Fall 1969; Winter–Spring 1970; Sanctuary Counteroffensive; and Counteroffensive, Phase VII.  

During combat operations in Vietnam, the UH-1A Iroquois Huey "slicks" were commonly known as "Black Jacks" and the UH-1D Iroquois gunships were commonly known as "Gamblers." https://www.vhpa.org/KIA/panel/battle/70061500.HTM; The Nine Days in May: The Battles of the 4th Infantry Division on the Cambodian Border, 1967 - June 1, 2017 by Warren K. Wilkins (Author).  The 4th Aviation "Attack Reconnaissance" Battalion was stationed at the base of Dragon Mountain, otherwise known as Camp Enari, 4th Infantry Division headquarters, in the Central Highlands of Pleiku, South Vietnam. http://www.armyflightschool.org/vietnam/4thrvn.html  In 1968, the Bell AH-1 Huey Cobra gunships entered service.  The 4th Aviation Battalion gunship motto was "Ace High."  https://www.army.mil/article/198493/vietnam_era_ah_1_cobra_ushered_in_modern_attack_fleet#:~:text=The%20Cobras%20began%20seeing%20combat,their%20time%20in%20the%20war.

The battalion was inactivated 4 December 1970 at Fort Lewis, Washington.

Headquarters and Headquarters Company, 4th Aviation Battalion, redesignated 21 November 1972 as Aviation Company, 4th Infantry Division, and activated at Fort Carson, Colorado

Reorganized and redesignated 17 March 1980 as Headquarters and Headquarters Company, 4th Aviation Battalion (organic elements concurrently activated)

Battalion reorganized and redesignated 16 August 1987 as the 4th Aviation, a parent regiment under the United States Army Regimental System. On 1 October 2005 the word 'Regiment' was formally added to the title.

Elements of the regiment participated in the Iraq War, including in 2005–06.

Globalsecurity said about the 4th Aviation Brigade, 4th Division that:
On 16 December 2004, the 4th Infantry Division officially became the Army's newest "modular" division. Major additions to the Division included nearly doubling the Aviation Brigade, which was expanded to include a new attack helicopter battalion and an assault helicopter battalion. The aviation brigade increased from 16 AH-64D Apache helicopters in one attack battalion to 48 Apaches in 2 battalions. 2-4th Aviation was also reorganized. Seven CH-47 helicopters from C/7-101st Aviation at Fort Campbell, Kentucky, deployed to Hood Army Airfield, Fort Hood, Texas on 18 November 2004. The helicopters were to become part of 2-4th Aviation. It had been 30 years since Chinooks were assigned to the Division.

As of December 2005, the Combat Aviation Brigade of the 4th Infantry Division was operating out of Camp Taji, Iraq, in support of Operation Iraqi Freedom. The Combat Aviation Brigade was assigned to support the 4th Infantry Division in a wide array of combat and logistical operations during its deployment.

Currently the regiment includes four battalions.

Current structure

 1st Battalion (Attack Reconnaissance) "Dragons"
 Iraq 2003-2004 / HQ at FOB Speicher
 Company A "Vipers"
 Iraq 2003-2004
 Company B (AH-64D) "Reapers"
 Iraq 2003-2004
 Company C (AH-64D) "Sidewinders"
 Iraq 2003-2004
 2nd Battalion (General Support) "Mustangs"
 Company A (UH-60)
 Company B (CH-47)
 Company C (HH-60)
 Company D (Maintenance) 
 3rd Battalion (Assault Helicopter)
 Company C (UH-60) "Warriors" at Butts Army Airfield
 4th Battalion (Butts Army Airfield, Fort Carson, Colorado)
 Company A (AH-64E)
 Company E

Decorations

Meritorious Unit Commendation (Army), Streamer embroidered VIETNAM 1967–1968
Meritorious Unit Commendation (Army), Streamer embroidered IRAQ 2005–2006
Army Superior Unit Award, Streamer embroidered 1996–1997
Republic of Vietnam Cross of Gallantry with Palm, Streamer embroidered VIETNAM 1966–1969
Republic of Vietnam Cross of Gallantry with Palm, Streamer embroidered VIETNAM 1969–1970
Republic of Vietnam Civil Action Honor Medal, First Class, Streamer embroidered VIETNAM 1969–1970

References

Citations

Bibliography

External links
 http://www.armyflightschool.org/vietnam/battalion.html

004
Military units and formations established in 1987